Khadavli is a railway station on the Central line of the Mumbai Suburban Railway network. Titwala is the previous stop and Vasind is the next stop.

References

Railway stations in Thane district
Mumbai Suburban Railway stations
Mumbai CR railway division
Kalyan-Igatpuri rail line